Dennis Eugene Carpenter (September 3, 1928 – December 23, 2003)  was an American politician, Republican member of the California State Senate from 1970 until 1978 and attorney at law. Carpenter was a Federal Bureau of Investigation special agent from 1955 until 1958. The Carpenter papers are archived at the University of California, Irvine.

References

External links
Join California Dennis E. Carpenter

Republican Party California state senators
Deaths from aneurysm
Politicians from Minneapolis
United States Army officers
United States Army soldiers
UCLA School of Law alumni
University of California, Los Angeles alumni
1928 births
2003 deaths
20th-century American politicians
Lawyers from Minneapolis
20th-century American lawyers